Masdevallia elephanticeps is a species of orchid occurring at high elevations in the Cordillera Oriental of Colombia.

References

External links 

elephanticeps
Endemic orchids of Colombia